The Hückel method or Hückel molecular orbital theory, proposed by Erich Hückel in 1930, is a simple method for calculating molecular orbitals as linear combinations of atomic orbitals. The theory predicts the molecular orbitals for π-electrons in π-delocalized molecules, such as ethylene, benzene, butadiene, and pyridine. It provides the theoretical basis for Hückel's rule that cyclic, planar molecules or ions with  π-electrons are aromatic. It was later extended to conjugated molecules such as pyridine, pyrrole and furan that contain atoms other than carbon and hydrogen (heteroatoms). A more dramatic extension of the method to include σ-electrons, known as the extended Hückel method (EHM), was developed by Roald Hoffmann.  The extended Hückel method gives some degree of quantitative accuracy for organic molecules in general (not just planar systems) and was used to provide computational justification for the Woodward–Hoffmann rules. To distinguish the original approach from Hoffmann's extension, the Hückel method is also known as the simple Hückel method (SHM).

Although undeniably a cornerstone of organic chemistry, Hückel's concepts were undeservedly unrecognized for two decades. Pauling and Wheland characterized his approach as "cumbersome" at the time, and their competing resonance theory was relatively easier to understand for chemists without fundamental physics background, even if they couldn't grasp the concept of quantum superposition and confused it with tautomerism. His lack of communication skills contributed: when Robert Robinson sent him a friendly request, he responded arrogantly that he is not interested in organic chemistry.

In spite of its simplicity, the Hückel method in its original form makes qualitatively accurate and chemically useful predictions for many common molecules and is therefore a powerful and widely taught educational tool.  It is described in many introductory quantum chemistry and physical organic chemistry textbooks, and organic chemists in particular still routinely apply Hückel theory to obtain a very approximate, back-of-the-envelope understanding of π-bonding.

Hückel characteristics

The method has several characteristics:
 It limits itself to conjugated molecules.
 Only π electron molecular orbitals are included because these determine much of the chemical and spectral properties of these molecules. The σ electrons are assumed to form the framework of the molecule and σ connectivity is used to determine whether two π orbitals interact.   However, the orbitals formed by σ electrons are ignored and assumed not to interact with π electrons. This is referred to as σ-π separability. It is justified by the orthogonality of σ and π orbitals in planar molecules. For this reason, the Hückel method is limited to systems that are planar or nearly so.
 The method is based on applying the variational method to linear combination of atomic orbitals and making simplifying assumptions regarding the overlap, resonance and Coulomb integrals of these atomic orbitals.  It does not attempt to solve the Schrödinger equation, and neither the functional form of the basis atomic orbitals nor details of the Hamiltonian are involved. 
 For hydrocarbons, the method takes atomic connectivity as the only input; empirical parameters are only needed when heteroatoms are introduced.
 The method predicts how many energy levels exist for a given molecule, which levels are degenerate and it expresses the molecular orbital energies in terms of two parameters, called α, the energy of an electron in a 2p orbital, and β, the interaction energy between two 2p orbitals (the extent to which an electron is stabilized by allowing it to delocalize between two orbitals).  The usual sign convention is to let both α and β be negative numbers. To understand and compare systems in a qualitative or even semi-quantitative sense, explicit numerical values for these parameters are typically not required.
 In addition the method also enables calculation of charge density for each atom in the π framework, the fractional bond order between any two atoms, and the overall molecular dipole moment.

Hückel results

Results for simple molecules and general results for cyclic and linear systems 
The results for a few simple molecules are tabulated below:

The theory predicts two energy levels for ethylene with its two π electrons filling the low-energy HOMO and the high energy LUMO remaining empty. In butadiene the 4 π-electrons occupy 2 low energy molecular orbitals, out of a total of 4, and for benzene 6 energy levels are predicted, two of them degenerate.

For linear and cyclic systems (with N atoms), general solutions exist:

 Linear system (polyene/polyenyl): .
 Energy levels are all distinct.

 Cyclic system, Hückel topology (annulene/annulenyl): .
 Energy levels  are each doubly degenerate.
 Cyclic system, Möbius topology (hypothetical for N < 8): .
 Energy levels  are each doubly degenerate.

The energy levels for cyclic systems can be predicted using the  mnemonic (named after the American chemist ).  A circle centered at α with radius 2β is inscribed with a regular N-gon with one vertex pointing down; the y-coordinate of the vertices of the polygon then represent the orbital energies of the [N]annulene/annulenyl system. Related mnemonics exists for linear and Möbius systems.

The values of α and β 
The value of α is the energy of an electron in a 2p orbital, relative to an unbound electron at infinity.  This quantity is negative, since the electron is stabilized by being electrostatically bound to the positively charged nucleus.  For carbon this value is known to be approximately –11.4 eV.  Since Hückel theory is generally only interested in energies relative to a reference localized system, the value of α is often immaterial and can be set to zero without affecting any conclusions.     

Roughly speaking, β physically represents the energy of stabilization experienced by an electron allowed to delocalize in a π molecular orbital formed from the 2p orbitals of adjacent atoms, compared to being localized in an isolated 2p atomic orbital.  As such, it is also a negative number, although it is often spoken of in terms of its absolute value.  The value for |β| in Hückel theory is roughly constant for structurally similar compounds, but not surprisingly, structurally dissimilar compounds will give very different values for |β|.  For example, using the π bond energy of ethylene (65 kcal/mole) and comparing the energy of a doubly-occupied π orbital (2α + 2β) with the energy of electrons in two isolated p orbitals (2α), a value of |β| = 32.5 kcal/mole can be inferred.  On the other hand, using the resonance energy of benzene (36 kcal/mole, derived from heats of hydrogenation) and comparing benzene (6α + 8β) with a hypothetical "non-aromatic 1,3,5-cyclohexatriene" (6α + 6β), a much smaller value of |β| = 18 kcal/mole emerges.  These differences are not surprising, given the substantially shorter bond length of ethylene (1.33 Å) compared to benzene (1.40 Å).  The shorter distance between the interacting p orbitals accounts for the greater energy of interaction, which is reflected by a higher value of |β|.  Nevertheless, heat of hydrogenation measurements of various polycyclic aromatic hydrocarbons like naphthalene and anthracene all imply values of |β| between 17 and 20 kcal/mol.     

However, even for the same compound, the correct assignment of |β| can be controversial.  For instance, it is argued that the resonance energy measured experimentally via heats of hydrogenation is diminished by the distortions in bond lengths that must take place going from the single and double bonds of "non-aromatic 1,3,5-cyclohexatriene" to the delocalized bonds of benzene.  Taking this distortion energy into account, the value of |β| for delocalization without geometric change (called the "vertical resonance energy") for benzene is found to be around 37 kcal/mole.  On the other hand, experimental measurements of electronic spectra have given a value of |β| (called the "spectroscopic resonance energy") as high as 3 eV (~70 kcal/mole) for benzene.  Given these subtleties, qualifications, and ambiguities, Hückel theory should not be called upon to provide accurate quantitative predictions – only semi-quantitative or qualitative trends and comparisons are reliable and robust.

Other successful predictions 
With this caveat in mind, many predictions of the theory have been experimentally verified: 
 The HOMO–LUMO gap, in terms of the β constant, correlates directly with the respective molecular electronic transitions observed with UV/VIS spectroscopy. For linear polyenes, the energy gap is given as:

from which a value for β can be obtained between −60 and −70 kcal/mol (−250 to −290 kJ/mol).
 The predicted molecular orbital  energies as stipulated by Koopmans' theorem correlate with photoelectron spectroscopy.
 The Hückel delocalization energy correlates with the experimental heat of combustion. This energy is defined as the difference between the total predicted π energy (in benzene 8β) and a hypothetical π energy in which all ethylene units are assumed isolated, each contributing 2β (making benzene 3 × 2β = 6β).
 Molecules with molecular orbitals paired up such that only the sign differs (for example α ± β) are called alternant hydrocarbons  and have in common small molecular dipole moments. This is in contrast to non-alternant hydrocarbons, such as azulene and fulvene that have large dipole moments. The Hückel theory is more accurate for alternant hydrocarbons.
 For cyclobutadiene the theory predicts that the two high-energy electrons occupy a degenerate pair of molecular orbitals (following from Hund's rules) that are neither stabilized nor destabilized. Hence the square molecule would be a very reactive triplet diradical (the ground state is actually rectangular without degenerate orbitals). In fact, all cyclic conjugated hydrocarbons with a total of 4n π-electrons share this molecular orbital pattern, and this forms the basis of Hückel's rule.
 Dewar reactivity numbers deriving from the Hückel approach correctly predict the reactivity of aromatic systems with nucleophiles and electrophiles.
The benzyl cation and anion serve as simple models for arenes with electron-withdrawing and electron-donating groups, respectively.  The π-electron population correctly implies the meta- and ortho-/para-selectivity for electrophilic aromatic substitution of π electron-poor and π electron-rich arenes, respectively.

Application in Optical Activity Analysis 
The analysis of the optical activity of a molecule depends to a certain extent on the study of its chiral characteristics. However, for achiral molecules applying pesudoscalars to simplify the calculations of optical avtivity cannot be achieved due to the lack of spatial average. 

Instead of traditional chiroptical solution measurements, Hückel theory helps focus on oriented π systems by separating from σ electrons especially in the planar, -symmetric cases. Transition dipole moments derived by multiplying each wavefunction of individual planar molecule one by one, contribute to the directions of the most optical activity, where sit at the bisectors of two orthogonal ones. Despite of the zero value for the trace of the tensor, cis-butadiene shows considerable offdiagonal component which was computated as the first optical avtivity evaluation of achiral molecule.

 

By using 3,5-dimethylene-1-cyclopentene as an example. Transition electric dipole, magnetic dipole and electric quadrupole moments interactions result in optical rotation(OR), which can be described by both tensor components and chemical geometries. The in phase overlap of two molecular orbitals yield negative charge while depleting charge out of phase. The movement can be interpreted quantitatively by corresponding π and π* orbitals coefficients.

Delocalization energy, π-bond orders, and π-electron populations  
The delocalization energy, π-bond orders, and π-electron population are chemically significant parameters that can be gleaned from the orbital energies and coefficients that are the direct outputs of Hückel theory. These are quantities strictly derived from theory, as opposed to measurable physical properties, though they correlate with measurable qualitative and quantitative properties of the chemical species. Delocalization energy is defined as the difference in energy between that of the most stable localized Lewis structure and the energy of the molecule computed from Hückel theory orbital energies and occupancies. Since all energies are relative, we set  without loss of generality to simplify discussion. The energy of the localized structure is then set to be 2β for every two-electron localized π-bond. Thus, the delocalization energy, conventionally a positive number, is defined as 

 .

In the case of benzene, the occupied orbitals have energies (again setting ) 2β, β, and β.

The π-bond orders derived from Hückel theory are defined using the orbital coefficients of the Hückel MOs.  The π-bond order between atoms j and k is defined as  

 , 

For benzene, the three occupied MOs, expressed as linear combinations of AOs , are: 

 , []; 
 , [];  
 , []. 

Perhaps surprisingly, the π-bond order formula gives a bond order of 

 

for the bond between carbons 1 and 2. The Hückel definition of bond order attempts to quantify any additional stabilization that the system enjoys resulting from delocalization. In a sense, the Hückel bond order suggests that there are four π-bonds in benzene instead of the three that are implied by the Kekulé-type Lewis structures. The "extra" bond is attributed to the additional stabilization that results from the aromaticity of the benzene molecule. (This is only one of several definitions for non-integral bond orders, and other definitions will lead to different values that fall between 1 and 2.)

The π-electron population is calculated in a very similar way to the bond order using the orbital coefficients of the Hückel MOs.  The π-electron population on atom j is defined as  

 . 

For carbon 1 on benzene, this yields a π-electron population of 
. 

Since each carbon atom contributes one π-electron to the molecule, this gives a Coulomb charge of 0 for carbon 1 (and all other carbon atoms), as expected.

In the cases of benzyl cation and benzyl anion shown above,

Mathematics behind the Hückel method 
The mathematics of the Hückel method is based on the Ritz method.  In short, given a basis set of n normalized atomic orbitals , an ansatz molecular orbital  is written down, with normalization constant N and coefficients  which are to be determined.  In other words, we are assuming that the molecular orbital (MO) can be written as a linear combination of atomic orbitals, a conceptually intuitive and convenient approximation (the linear combination of atomic orbitals or LCAO approximation).  The variational theorem states that given an eigenvalue problem  with smallest eigenvalue  and corresponding wavefunction , any normalized trial wavefunction  (i.e.,  holds) will satisfy

 , 
with equality holding if and only if .  Thus, by minimizing  with respect to coefficients  for normalized trial wavefunctions , we obtain a closer approximation of the true ground-state wavefunction and its energy.  

Then, we substitute the ansatz into the expression for E and expand, yielding

 , where , 
In the remainder of the derivation, we will assume that the atomic orbitals are real. (For the simple case of the Hückel theory, they will be the 2pz orbitals on carbon.) Thus, and because the Hamiltonian operator is hermitian, .

 .

By a well-known result from linear algebra, nontrivial solutions  to the above system of linear equations can only exist if the coefficient matrix  is singular. Hence,  must have a value such that the determinant of the coefficient matrix vanishes: 

 .    (*)
This determinant expression is known as the secular determinant and gives rise to a generalized eigenvalue problem.

In particular, it is first assumed that distinct  have zero overlap. Together with the assumption that  are normalized, this means that the overlap matrix is the n × n identity matrix: . Solving for E in (*) then reduces to finding the eigenvalues of the Hamiltonian matrix.

Second, in the simplest case of a planar, unsaturated hydrocarbon, the Hamiltonian matrix  is parameterized in the following way:

     (**)

This neglect of orbital overlap is an especially severe approximation. In actuality, orbital overlap is a prerequisite for orbital interaction, and it is impossible to have  while . A major consequence of having nonzero overlap integrals is the fact that, compared to non-interacting isolated orbitals, bonding orbitals are not energetically stabilized by nearly as much as antibonding orbitals are destabilized. The orbital energies derived from the Hückel treatment do not account for this asymmetry (see Hückel solution for ethylene (below) for details).

Using the expression for the normalization constant N and the fact that , we can find the normalized MOs by incorporating the additional condition

 .

The Hückel MOs are thus uniquely determined when eigenvalues are all distinct. When that happens, further assumptions pertaining to the coefficients of the degenerate orbitals (usually ones that make the MOs orthogonal and mathematically convenient) have to be made in order to generate a concrete set of molecular orbital functions.

Hückel solution for ethylene in detail
In the Hückel treatment for ethylene, we write the Hückel MOs  as a linear combination of the atomic orbitals (2p orbitals) on each of the carbon atoms:
.
Applying the result obtained by the Ritz method, we have the system of equations

,
 
where:
 
 and
.
 
(Since 2pz atomic orbital can be expressed as a pure real function, the * representing complex conjugation can be dropped.)  The Hückel method assumes that all overlap integrals (including the normalization integrals) equal the Kronecker delta, all Coulomb integrals  are equal, and the resonance integral  is nonzero when the atoms i and j are bonded.  Using the standard Hückel variable names, we set
 
,
,
, and
.
The Hamiltonian matrix is
. 
The matrix equation that needs to be solved is then

, 

.

Setting , we obtain

.    (***)

 
.
 
 
, or
.

Since , the energy levels are

, or
.

The coefficients can then be found by expanding (***):

and
.

Since the matrix is singular, the two equations are linearly dependent, and the solution set is not uniquely determined until we apply the normalization condition.

, or
.

Finally, the Hückel molecular orbitals are

.

,

while the corresponding orbitals would take the form 

.

An important consequence of setting  is that the bonding (in-phase) combination is always stabilized to a lesser extent than the antibonding (out-of-phase) combination is destabilized, relative to the energy of the free 2p orbital.  Thus, in general, 2-center 4-electron interactions, where both the bonding and antibonding orbitals are occupied, are destabilizing overall.  This asymmetry is ignored by Hückel theory.  In general, for the orbital energies derived from Hückel theory, the sum of stabilization energies for the bonding orbitals is equal to the sum of destabilization energies for the antibonding orbitals, as in the simplest case of ethylene shown here and the case of butadiene shown below.

Hückel solution for 1,3-butadiene

The Hückel MO theory treatment of 1,3-butadiene is largely analogous to the treatment of ethylene, shown in detail above, though we must now find the eigenvalues and eigenvectors of a 4 × 4 Hamiltonian matrix.  We first write the molecular orbital  as a linear combination of the four atomic orbitals  (carbon 2p orbitals) with coefficients :

.
The Hamiltonian matrix is
. 

In the same way, we write the secular equations in matrix form as

,

which leads to

and

, or approximately, 
The orbitals are given by
,  
, 
, and 
.

See also
 Möbius–Hückel concept
 Möbius aromaticity
 Tight Binding

External links
 "Hückel method" at chem.swin.edu.au, webpage:  mod3-huckel.
 
Rauk, Arvi. SHMO, Simple Hückel Molecular Orbital Theory Calculator.  Java Applet (downloadable) .

Further reading 
 The HMO-Model and its applications: Basis and Manipulation, E. Heilbronner and H. Bock, English translation, 1976, Verlag Chemie.
 The HMO-Model and its applications: Problems with Solutions, E. Heilbronner and H. Bock, English translation, 1976, Verlag Chemie.
 The HMO-Model and its applications: Tables of Hückel Molecular Orbitals, E. Heilbronner and H. Bock, English translation, 1976, Verlag Chemie.

References

Molecular physics
Semiempirical quantum chemistry methods